DeGroot is an agglutinated form of the Dutch surname De Groot. It may refer to:

People
Bruce DeGroot (born 1963), American politician
Chad DeGroot (born 1974), American freestyle BMX rider

Diede de Groot (born 1986), Dutch Tennis Grand Slam Champion
Dudley DeGroot (1899–1970), American athlete and coach
Gerard DeGroot, author of the 2008 book The Sixties Unplugged
Jeff DeGroot (born 1985), American soccer player

Morris H. DeGroot (1931–1989), American statistician

Characters
Gerald and Karen DeGroot, characters on the American television show Lost
LuAnn DeGroot, main character of the comic strip Luann
Tavish Finnegan DeGroot, the real name of the Demoman class from Team Fortress 2

See also
De Groot, a surname
De Groote, a surname
Groot (surname)